The deepwater grenadier (Coryphaenoides profundicolus) is a species of deep-sea fish in the family Macrouridae.

Description
Olfaction and taste are important senses for finding prey, which is unsurprising as it lives in the near-total darkness of the deep sea. It has a swim bladder, showing that it is a mobile forager.

Habitat

The specific name is from Latin profundus ("deep") and the suffix -colus ("inhabitant"); -colus, -colum is not considered to be correct Latin but is still used in several species names. Otolith studies have shown that the deepwater grenadier lives at a variety of temperatures during its life.

Behaviour

It is parasitised by Lepidapedon zubchenkoi and Steringophorus thulini, both trematode worms of the order Plagiorchiida.

References

Macrouridae
Fish described in 1957
Taxa named by Orvar Nybelin